Derek and Clive Ad Nauseam is the third and final recording made by Peter Cook and Dudley Moore featuring their characters Derek and Clive. It also charts the breakup of Cook and Moore's partnership.

As a marketing ploy the record was initially released with its own aeroplane sickbag. Moore walked out before the end of this recording as he found his relationship with Cook untenable, particularly because of the level of vitriol directed at him throughout the sessions. The two never worked on a major project again.

Cook filmed some of the proceedings and these were released on the documentary Derek and Clive Get the Horn.

Track listing
All tracks by Peter Cook & Dudley Moore

Side 1
 "Endangered Species" – 5:23
 "Horse Racing" – 2:47
 "TV" – 1:27
 "Bruce Forsyth" – 0:43
 "Records" – 5:01
 "Soul Time" – 1:44
 "Russia" – 1:47
 "Sir" – 3:07 
 "Celebrity Suicide" – 2:58
 "Politics" – 1:27
 "Labels" – 3:10 
 "Street Music" – 0:43

Side 2
 "The Horn" – 23:17
 "Mona" – 3:29
 "The Critics" – 3:30

Extra material added for CD release in November 1989
 "Intergalactic Sex" - 0:51
 "Rape, Death And Paralysis" - 3:02
 "Lady Vera Fart Teller" - 2:21
 "I Can't Shit" - 1:42
 "Sex Manual" - 8:27
 "Stupid" - 0:23

Personnel
Peter Cook – vocals
Dudley Moore – vocals & production

1978 albums
Derek and Clive albums